Troika is a collaborative album by progressive rock/metal musicians Nick D'Virgilio (Big Big Train, ex-Spock's Beard), Neal Morse (The Neal Morse Band, Transatlantic, Flying Colors, ex-Spock's Beard) and Ross Jennings (Haken, Novena) under the moniker D'Virgilio, Morse & Jennings. It was released through InsideOut Music on February 25, 2022.

Background 
The album was envisioned by Neal Morse, who wanted to create acoustic songs with vocal harmonies. He first thought of his former Spock's Beard mate Nick D'Virgilio, and then they considered Ross Jennings for the third voice. Jennings commented that people shouldn't expect a "Spock's Beard meets Haken" album, and the trio has compared itself to Crosby, Stills and Nash.

The album was officially announced in September 2021. In November 29 they teased the first single "Julia"; the song was later released on December 21, 2021, alongside the announcement of the album's release date. "Julia" was written by Jennings as a 8-minute epic, which was later shortened by Morse.

The second single, "Everything I Am", came on January 11, 2022. It was written by Morse "one morning when my wife was having a bad day and it's about how no matter what happens our lives are fully intertwined no matter what." The third single, "You Set My Soul on Fire", was written by D'Virgilio and came out on February 8.

Critical reception 

Scott Medina, on Sonic Perspectives, commented that "to some degree, the project has already realized its potential within the course of one minute. The rest is just icing." He criticized the song order, believing that the first half was "much more acoustic-based and the rockers coming towards the latter half, making for a confusing listening experience. Mixing it up more could have made for a better-rounded presentation of the range of the material." He ultimately said that the trio "let their voices run wild in joy as if they had been let out on recess from their day jobs."

Track listing

Personnel
 Nick D'Virgilio – vocals; drums; percussion; bass, acoustic and electric guitars; tron flute
 Neal Morse – vocals; acoustic, bass, fretless bass, slide and electric guitars; organ, Windkey, electric piano, mandolin
 Ross Jennings – vocals; lead electric and 6 & 12-string acoustic guitar; EBow; synth
 Tony Levin – bass on "If I Could"

Charts

References

2022 debut albums
Inside Out Music albums
Neal Morse albums